The acronym LOTR may refer to:

 The Lord of the Rings, a novel by J. R. R. Tolkien
 "Leave outside the Immigration Rules", an aspect of Leave to enter under British immigration policy